Uk Heo is a university distinguished professor of political science in the University of Wisconsin–Milwaukee.

Education
Heo obtained his B.A. from Yonsei University in Seoul, Korea. He then went on to earn his MA degree from the University of Wyoming and finally his Ph.D. from Texas A&M University.

Selected publications
"South Korea's Rise: Economic Development, Power, and Foreign Relations." Cambridge: Cambridge University Press. 2014. (with Terence Roehrig).
South Korea since 1980. Cambridge: Cambridge University Press. 2010. (with Terence Roehrig).
"The Relationship between Defense Spending and Economic Growth in the United States." 2010. Political Research Quarterly 63(4): 760–770.
"The Economic Effects of US and Japanese Foreign Direct Investment in East Asia: A Comparative Analysis." 2008. Policy Studies Journal 36(3): 385-402 (with Sung Deuk Hahm).
"The North Korean Nuclear Crisis: Causes, Progress, and Prospects." 2008. Korea Observer 39(4): 487-506 (with Jung-Yeop Woo).
"The US-ROK Alliance: Security Implications of the South Korea-US Free Trade Agreement." 2008. Pacific Focus 33(3): 365–382.
"Political Choices and Economic Outcomes: A Perspective on the Differential Impact of the Financial Crisis on South Korea and Taiwan" 2003. Comparative Political Studies 36(6): 679–698. (with Alexander C. Tan)*
"A Nested Game Approach to Political and Economic Liberalization in Democratizing States: The Case of South Korea" 2002. International Studies Quarterly 46(3): 401–422. (with Neal Jesse and Karl DeRouen Jr.)
"Defense Contracting and Domestic Politics." 2000. Political Research Quarterly 53(4): 753–769. (with Karl DeRouen Jr.)
"Defense Spending and Economic Growth in South Korea: The Indirect Link." 1999. Journal of Peace Research 36(6): 699–708.
"Modeling the Defense-Growth Relationship Around the Globe." 1998. Journal of Conflict Resolution 42(5):637-657.
"Military Expenditures, Technological Change, and Economic Growth in the East Asian NICs." 1998. Journal of Politics 60(3): 830–846. (with Karl DeRouen Jr.)

References

Living people
Yonsei University alumni
University of Wyoming alumni
Texas A&M University alumni
University of Wisconsin–Milwaukee faculty
Political science writers
American political scientists
Year of birth missing (living people)